Brima Koroma (born 8 July 1984) is a professional Sierra Leonean footballer.

Career 
Koroma played as a striker for Anagennisi Dherynia in the Cypriot First Division.

He has also played for Sierra Leone, scoring a goal in 2006 World Cup qualifying against Congo.

Personal life 
Koroma is from Makeni, in Bombali District, in the Northern Province of Sierra Leone.

Notes

1984 births
Living people
Sierra Leonean footballers
Sierra Leonean expatriate footballers
Expatriate footballers in Cyprus
Association football forwards
Expatriate footballers in Sweden
Expatriate footballers in Brazil
Anagennisi Deryneia FC players
Expatriate footballers in the Faroe Islands
Kalmar FF players
Essinge IK players
Botafogo de Futebol e Regatas players
People from Makeni
Sierra Leonean expatriate sportspeople in Sweden
Allsvenskan players
Cypriot First Division players
Temne people
Sierra Leone international footballers